Casta Diva can refer to:

 "Casta diva" (aria), aria from the opera Norma by Bellini
 Mandarin Oriental, Lake Como, a resort in Blevio, Como, Italy formerly known as Casta Diva. 
 Casta Diva (1935 film), 1935 Italian musical film
 Casta Diva (1954 film), 1954 Italian drama film